Vanduin Bayasgalan (born 4 November 1954) is a Mongolian boxer. He competed in the men's light flyweight event at the 1980 Summer Olympics. At the 1980 Summer Olympics, he lost to Gilberto Sosa of Mexico.

References

External links
 

1954 births
Living people
Mongolian male boxers
Olympic boxers of Mongolia
Boxers at the 1980 Summer Olympics
Place of birth missing (living people)
Boxers at the 1978 Asian Games
Asian Games competitors for Mongolia
Light-flyweight boxers
21st-century Mongolian people
20th-century Mongolian people